The officer in charge (OIC) is the gazetted officer in command of a police station in Bangladesh and Sri Lanka. He/she is in charge of most of the investigations of the station and for maintenance of law and order within that police area.

External links & references
Issuing of Clearance Certificates

Police ranks of Sri Lanka